Michael Hennig (born 14 July 1955) is a German weightlifter. He competed in the men's heavyweight I event at the 1980 Summer Olympics.

References

1955 births
Living people
German male weightlifters
Olympic weightlifters of East Germany
Weightlifters at the 1980 Summer Olympics